The 2017 Russian Women's Football Championship was the 26th season of the Russian women's football top level league. WFC Rossiyanka were the defending champions.

Teams

League table

Results

Top scorers

Hat-tricks

4 Player scored 4 goals

References 

2017
Rus
Wom
Rus
Wom